The Vancouver School of Economics  (also known as VSE) is a school of the University of British Columbia located in Vancouver, BC, Canada. The school ranks as one of the top 25 in the world and top in Canada. The school exhibits high research activity and offers undergraduate and graduate degrees.

International rankings and recognitions
The Vancouver School of Economics is ranked:

 First in Canada, according to a November 2013 study done by IDEAS 
16th in the world (1st in Canada) by the Times Higher Education ranking for the social sciences category, which includes economics.
 23rd in the world (2nd in Canada) by Tilburg University based on research contribution from 2007 to 2011.
 24th in the world (1st in Canada) by the Academy Ranking of World Universities (ARWU) for the economics/business category in 2010.
 24th in the world (1st in Canada) from 1990 to 2000 period by Dr. Tom Coupe, director of the Kyiv School of Economics in an independent study that included the use of 11 methodologies.
 25th in the world (1st in Canada) as of June 2012 by the Research Papers in Economics.
25th in the world (2nd in Canada) by the Tilburg University Top 100 Worldwide Economics Schools Research Ranking based on research contribution 2007–2011.

The school's faculty have won five of the eleven John Rae Prizes given by the Canadian Economics Association. This prize is awarded to the Canadian economist with the best recent research. In 2018, Siwan Anderson, a development economist at the VSE, received the Rae prize, becoming its first woman recipient.

Research

The School manages the British Columbia Inter-University Research Data Centre. The RDC provides access, for approved projects, to selected confidential Statistics Canada micro-level data.

Additionally, the School operates the Experimental Lab, an active hive for research in the emerging field of experimental economics; and the Institute for Advanced Studies in Economics, a collaborative teaching and research initiative by the Vancouver School of Economics and the Strategy and Business Economics Division, Sauder School of Business.

Academic

Programs

Bachelor of Arts in Economics Programs: Honours, Major/Combined Major, Minor, and Second Degree (third year entry into programs)

Bachelor of International Economics Program (direct entry, 4-year, cohort-based degree)

Master of Arts in Economics Program (12-month program)

Doctoral Program

2013/14 Academic Year enrolment statistics

In 2002, UBC's Faculty of Arts expanded the number of full-time equivalent undergraduate student spaces in economics by 50%, as it is one of the most popular areas of study at UBC. Admittance to an academic program in economics at UBC is highly competitive. Academic programs in economics in UBC's Faculty of Arts are all administrated by the Vancouver School of Economics (formerly the Department of Economics). For instance, for the September 2013 intake for the 85 spaces in the BIE program over 2,100 applications were received; and over 480 applications were submitted for the 284 third-year spaces available in the Majors program.

Undergraduate BA programs (honours, major/combined majors, minors, dual degrees) – 1,042 students. Additionally, several hundred students take undergraduate BA courses in economics each term as general electives.
Undergraduate BIE program – 84 students for the inaugural year of the program.
Graduate MA program – 45 students in the 2013/14 academic year
Graduate PhD program – 67 students in the 2013/14 academic year; admits an entering class of about 15 students annually.

Faculty and alumni

The VSE (and its predecessor, the Department of Economics) has many reputable faculty and alumni, including:

 Nobel Prize-winning economist, Robert Mundell, who studied economics as an undergraduate at UBC. Mundell received the Nobel Memorial Prize in Economic Sciences in 1999 for his pioneering work in monetary dynamics and optimum currency areas. Mundell laid the groundwork for the introduction of the euro through this work and helped to start the movement known as supply-side economics. Mundell is also known for the Mundell–Fleming model and Mundell–Tobin effect.
 Dominic Barton is the worldwide managing director and head of McKinsey & Company. Graduating with an undergraduate degree in economics at UBC in 1984, Barton received the Rhodes Scholarship to attend the University of Oxford at Brasenose College. He was previously McKinsey’s chairman in Asia from 2004 to 2009, based in Shanghai and led McKinsey's office in South Korea from 2000 to 2004. Barton is an established author in topics of financial services and economic development in Asia. He is also a trustee of the Rhodes Trust and the Brookings Institution, and an honorary fellow at Brasenose College, Oxford.
 James Brander graduated from UBC in 1975 with a degree in economics. He is known as co-author of a seminal 1986 article in The American Economic Review, with Tracy R. Lewis, on “Oligopoly and Financial Structure: The Limited Liability Effect”, as well as his work in international trade with Barbara Spencer, particularly the Brander Spencer model.
 Paul Beaudry is a professor and Canada Research Chair in the UBC VSE at the University of British Columbia. His main fields of research are macroeconomics, the economics of technical change and labour economics. He is also a Fellow of the Bank of Canada.
Marina Adshade is a lecturer at VSE and is the author of The Love Market: What You Need to Know About How We Date, Mate and Marry and Dollars and Sex: How Economics Influences Sex and Love. She has also written a chapter titled Sexbot-Induced Social Change: An Economic Perspective in Robot Sex: Social and Ethical Implications by John Danaher and Neil McArthur.
 Gideon Rosenbluth (born 1921), Canadian economist and professor at the department (his concentration ratio Rosenbluth index)
 Chris Fowler is an alumnus from the department. He is the chief operating officer of the Canadian Western Bank, a multi-billion asset Canadian bank.
 Robert C. Allen was a professor in the VSE from 1980 to 1985 and 1985–2000. He is a professor of economic history at Oxford University. He is the author of: 'Enclosure and the Yeoman: The Agricultural Development of the South Midlands, 1450–1850 (1992), Farm to Factory: A Re-interpretation of the Soviet Industrial Revolution (2003), The British Industrial Revolution in Global Perspective'' (2009). He was awarded the Ranki Prize of the Economic History Association for his 1992 and 2003 works.
 Thomas Fujiwara is an alumnus from the VSE. He is a professor at the Department of Economics at Princeton University, as well as a Faculty Research Fellow of the National Bureau of Economic Research.

Students

Students in the VSE come from many backgrounds and represent diverse and international backgrounds. The undergraduate students are represented to the school by the Vancouver School of Economics Undergraduate Society (VSEUS.) The graduate students also have representatives (1 in Masters and 1 in PhD) that represent their respective needs to appropriate bodies within the university. Student activities supported by the Vancouver School of Economics include the Iona Journal of Economics, an undergraduate economic research journal published annually.

Faculty

In September 2013, the school had 67 faculty members specialize in a wide range of topics, including banking policy, taxation effects, global macroeconomics, labour market and skills development, gender and environmental economics, developmental economics, economic history, and the emerging field of experimental economics.

Faculty members include eight researchers affiliated with the National Bureau of Economic Research, six researchers affiliated with the Canadian Institute for Advanced Research, two current and one former research fellow of the Bank of Canada, two elected fellows of the Econometric Society, four fellows of the Royal Society of Canada, and one of the Distinguished Fellows of the American Economic Association.

Professors Emeritus – 16
Professorial Faculty (Professors, Associate Professors and Assistant Professors) – 38
Lecturers, Instructors and Visiting Faculty – 13
Affiliated Economics Faculty (Strategy and Business Economics Division, Sauder School of Business) – 7

References 

University of British Columbia
Economics schools
1915 establishments in British Columbia
Educational institutions established in 1915